Charles James Bowring (27 August 1887 – 16 January 1959) made four first-class appearances as a professional cricketer for Somerset in the 1913 cricket season.

Used as an opening or middle order batsman, Bowring, who was born at Portland, Dorset, made little impact, failing to reach double figures until his last first-class innings, when he made 15 against Hampshire at Portsmouth. In the previous match, against Kent at Taunton he took three wickets for 24 runs in 31 balls, his only first-class wickets.

Bowring died at Preston, near Yeovil.

References

1887 births
1959 deaths
English cricketers
Somerset cricketers